The Cielito Zamora Senior High School is a public senior secondary school on Molave St., Cristina Homes, Cielito, Caloocan, Caloocan, Philippines. It was founded in 2016 as Cielito Zamora Senior High School. It offers Technical Vocational Livelihood and specializes in Information and Communication Technology, Home Economics, Humanities, and Social Sciences.

References

External links
Facebook page

High schools in Metro Manila
Schools in Caloocan
Educational institutions established in 2016
2016 establishments in the Philippines